Count Berengar II of Sulzbach (c. 1080–83 – 3 December 1125), sometimes known as Berengar I of Sulzbach, was Count of Sulzbach in Bavaria.
Berengar was a leader of the reform party. He sided with Pope Gregory VII during the Investiture Controversy in opposition to Henry IV, Holy Roman Emperor, and supported Henry V in his successful rebellion against his father. He is known as the founder of several abbeys.

Family

Berengar was the son of Count Gebhard II of Sulzbach (died 1085) and Irmgard of Rott (died 14 June 1101).
His sister Adelaide may have married Count Siboto II of Weyarn-Falkenstein, who was later the advocate of Baumburg Abbey.
The Weyarns at first supported Henry IV in his conflict with Pope Gregory VII during the Investiture Controversy.
Later Siboto II was associated with the pro-papal side that included the Sulzbachs.

Around 1099 Berengar married Adelaide, widow and heiress of Count Udalric of Passau, nicknamed "the very rich".
Count Udalric's cousin, the Count palatine Rapoto of Bavaria, had died around the same time as Udalric and had been succeeded by Berengar's relative Diepold III, margrave of the Nordgau in Bavaria, who inherited the titles of Count of Cham and Margrave of Vuhburg.
Berengar was married to Adelheid von Lechsgemünd for over six years until her death in 1105. This marriage seems to have been childless.

Berengar's second wife was Adelheid von Dießen-Wolfratshausen, with whom he had six children,
Four of these children married into the highest circles.
His son, Count Gebhard III of Sulzbach, married Matilda, daughter of Henry IX, Duke of Bavaria.
His daughter Gertrude was the wife of King Conrad III of Germany.
And Luitgarde was the wife of Godfrey II, Count of Louvain and Duke of Lower Lorraine.
In 1143 his daughter Bertha, later known as Irene, married the Emperor Manuel I Komnenos of Byzantium (c. 1120–1180).

Advisor to Henry V

On 5 February 1104 Count Sigehard of Burghausen was murdered, and Henry IV, Holy Roman Emperor, was blamed for the crime.
Berengar was one of the Bavarian Nordgau princes who held the emperor responsible for the murder.
They encouraged Henry V to rebel against his father. The noble reform party thought that the Henry IV was leading the people to destruction and only the true church, the church of the Gregorian and Monastic Reform, could point the way to salvation.

On 12 December 1104 King Henry V with a small retinue left his father's camp in Fritzlar and took refuge in Bavaria, the start of the rebellion.
During the struggle from 1104 to 1106 Berengar was often with Henry V and one of his key advisers in affairs of the kingdom.
In 1106 Henry IV took refuge from his son in Regensburg, calling for assistance from the Czech Duke Bořivoj. The Czech army came up, but when they saw that Henry V was supported by Margrave Diepold III and Count Berengar they retreated.
The emperor continued his flight, and died at Liège on 8 August 1106.

Between 1108 and 1111 Berengar took part in the campaigns in Hungary and Poland and on Henry's expedition to Rome. 
From January 1116 to autumn 1119 there is no sign of his presence at the royal court of Henry V.
It is believed that during this time Count Berengar dedicated his absence from the royal court to increasing his monasteries.

Henry V died on 23 May 1125. Berengar was present at the emperor's funeral, and was one of the signatories to a letter inviting the leading men of the kingdom to attend a diet on 25 August 1125 to elect a successor. The first signatory was Adalbert I, Archbishop of Mainz, the archchancellor of Germany. The other secular signatories were Henry IX, Duke of Bavaria, Frederick II, Duke of Swabia and Godfrey, Count Palatine.

Berengar died on 3 December 1125 and was succeeded by his son Gebhard III.

Religious foundations

As one of the leaders of the ecclesiastical reform circle in Upper Bavaria, Swabia and Saxony Berengar was one of the founders of the Abbeys of Berchtesgaden, Kastl, and Baumberg.

Berchtesgaden Provostry

Berengar's first monastery foundation, the Berchtesgaden Provostry, was commissioned by his mother Irmgard of Rott. According to legend, it was founded in fulfillment of a vow of thanksgiving for the salvation of his father, Gebhard II of Sulzbach, after a hunting accident at the rock on which the Berchtesgaden Collegiate Church stands today.
His mother Irmgard owned Berchtesgaden from her first marriage with Count Engelbert V of Chiemgau, and as his widow had made a vow to have a house built for use by an "assembly of clergy of communal life" ("congregatio clericorum communis vite"). Due to various worldly affairs Irmgard did not have the time to found the congregation, so shortly before her death she commissioned Berengar with the task, to promote his and her salvation.

In the year of his mother's death, 1101, Berengar appointed the canon Eberwin as the first provost.
Under his guidance, he sent three Augustinian canons and four lay brothers to Berchtesgaden from Rottenbuch Abbey, the mother abbey of the Augustinians in Altbayern and a center of the canonical reform movement. 
Berengar and his half-brother Kuno von Horburg-Lechsgemünd then requested papal confirmation for the founding of the monastery. 
Probably in 1102 and no later than 1105 Kuno von Horburg and Eberwin traveled to Rome on behalf of Berengar.
Pope Paschal II had very likely on 7 April 1102 placed the Count's monastery under his protection.
He confirmed this privilege in writing to Berengar and Kuno von Horburg.

According to the Fundatio monasterii Berchtesgadensis the Augustinians at first found the lonely wilderness of Berchtesgaden, with its terrifying mountain forests, and permanent ice and snow a very inhospitable place, and sought somewhere more suitable.

Kastl Abbey

After the Lateran council of March/April 1102, on 12 May 1102 Berengar was granted the privilege of founding the St Peter monastery in Kastl according to the Hirsauer reform.
Berengar co-founded the abbey with Count Friedrich of Kastl-Habsberg and his son Otto.
Diepold III of Cham-Vohburg also assisted with the foundation.

Baumburg Abbey

In 1102 Paschal gave Berengar the privilege of founding Baumburg Abbey.
In 1104–06 Berengar was deeply involved in the struggles of Henry V against his father Emperor Henry IV, and was unable to implement the wishes of his wife Adelheid von Lechsgemünd to spend the inheritance from her first two marriages to establish a Reform congregation.
Adelheid therefore felt compelled before her death (1104/1105) to place her husband and a dozen selected ministers under oath to establish a regular canons monastery to the north of lake Chiemsee and to annex the existing church of St. Margaret in Baumburg.
But to found two monasteries within three or four years and to participate in the reform of the Kastl Abbey at the same time gave him great difficulty.
He therefore followed the urging of his church officials and expanded Baumburg with goods from Berchtesgaden so he would have at least one well-equipped monastery, and would meet the wishes of his mother and first wife.

In 1107, or at the latest in 1109, Eberwin and his monks from Berchtesgaden founded Baumburg Abbey in the north of the present Traunstein district.
Later, probably around 1116, Eberwin  returned to Berchtesgaden where the first major land clearing was undertaken and the Augustinians settled permanently. 
The independence of Berchtesgaden was not secure, since Gottschalk (ca. 1120–1163), provost of Baumburg, was not willing to accept the loss of the Berchtesgaden assets.
After Berengar died in 1125, Gottschalk challenged the legality of the separation and asked Archbishop Conrad I of Salzburg for an injunction to re-merge the properties.
Conrad finally confirmed the independence of both monasteries in 1136, which was confirmed by Pope Innocent II in 1142.

References

Sources

11th-century births
1125 deaths
Counts of the Holy Roman Empire